Johnny Kennedy may refer to:

 Jonny Kennedy (1966–2003), subject of the documentary The Boy Whose Skin Fell Off
 Jonny Kennedy (rugby union) (born 1990), rugby union player